Nanopond may refer to:
a billionth of a pond
a digital organism simulator; see Artificial life#Program-based